Sudetes Foothills or Sudeten Foreland (Przedgórze Sudeckie, Czech: Krkonošsko-jesenické podhůří, Sudetské podhůří, German: Sudetenvorland) is an area (macroregion) located north of the Sudetes proper, being connected with them, but separated from the Sudetes by a distinct tectonic line (Sudetic marginal fault). The region is divided between Poland and the Czech Republic.

The highest elevation is Ślęża at 718 m above sea level.

From the northwest, the Sudetes Foothills border with the Silesian-Lusatian Lowland, from the northeast with the Silesian Lowland, from the southeast, south, and southwest with the Sudetes.

Rivers and waters
Nysa Kłodzka, Bystrzyca, Oława, Ślęza, Jezioro Otmuchowskie, Lake Mietkowskie and Paczkowski Bay.

Main cities
Świdnica, Dzierżoniów, Bielawa (partly), Świebodzice (partly), Strzegom, Ząbkowice Śląskie, Strzelin (partly), Pieszyce (partly), Ziębice, Paczków, Sobótka (partly), Żarów, Piława Górna, Jaworzyna Śląska, Otmuchów, Niemcza, Javorník (Czech Republic), Złoty Stok (partly), Bardo, and Žulová (Czech Republic).

References

Literature
 Jerzy Kondracki: Geografia regionalna Polski. Wyd. 3. Warszawa: Wydawnictwa Naukowe PWN, 2014. ISBN 978-83-01-16022-7. OCLC 924755614.
 Wojciech Walczak: Dolny Śląsk. Cz. 2, Obszar przedsudecki. Warszawa: Państwowe Wydawnictwo Naukowe, 1970. OCLC 749530821.
 Przedgórze Sudeckie. Skala 1:50 000. Wyd. 1. Wrocław: Studio PLAN, 2013.

Geography of Silesia
Sudetes
Foreland basins